"Baby" is a song released by American record label Quality Control, performed by American rappers Lil Baby and DaBaby. The song was released through Quality Control Music, Motown, and Universal Music Group. It was produced by Wheezy and released on July 17, 2019.as a single off of QC's second studio album, Control the Streets, Volume 2  (2019). The song received acclaim from critics, with particular praise for DaBaby's verse. The song's official video features Lil Baby and DaBaby portraying characters from the movie Scarface.

Lyrics 
In the song, Lil Baby references fellow Atlanta rapper, Bankroll Fresh, who was murdered in 2016. He claims that though he has become a millionaire he still spends time in the "projects". He raps his rags-to-riches come-up from a third-person perspective with an "infectious hook". The word "baby" is said a total of 37 times throughout the 2 and a half-minute track.

Critical reception 
"Baby" received acclaim from music critics. HipHopDX called the collaboration "a match made in heaven", and in their album review, commended Wheezy's production as "magical stepping stones for Lil Baby to lay his verse as he boasts about still hanging out in the projects and DaBaby smashes on the beat equally, while both maintain their own unique way of rhyming". Robert Blair of HotNewHipHop ranked DaBaby's verse on the song as his fifth best of 2019, noting how Lil Baby "handles the more melodic facets of the track" while DaBaby "comes through with a gripping verse that makes audacious claims of Baby gettin jiggy, on stage with the Glizzy/Baby CEO, he shake the game like he Diddy'''". SPIN magazine's Israel Daramola described the track as "a quaint record that delivers on its promise of showcasing all the two Babys have to offer us", while Christoper R. Weingarten, in review of the song's parent album, recommended it as a go-to-track, from "two of the most important rappers of 2019" and labelled it as "something that may portend rap's near future".

 Music video 
The music video was released on August 13, 2019, three days before the release of the album. It shows Lil Baby & DaBaby in scenes from the movie Scarface''. As February 2021 the video has over 100 million views.

Commercial performance 
The song debuted at number 42 on the Billboard Hot 100, and eventually rose to number 21 off of the release of the album and the music video.

Live performances 
Lil Baby and DaBaby performed the song at the 2019 BET Hip-Hop Awards, where DaBaby also won the award for Best New Artist.

Charts

Weekly charts

Year-end charts

References

2019 singles
2019 songs
DaBaby songs
Lil Baby songs
Song recordings produced by Wheezy (record producer)
Songs written by Wheezy (record producer)
Songs written by Lil Baby
Songs written by DaBaby
Motown singles
Universal Music Group singles